Simon Yam Tat-wah (born 19 March 1955) is a Hong Kong actor and film producer. He received international acclaim for his performances in international film festival and box office hits such as Naked Killer, SPL: Sha Po Lang, Election, Election 2 , Exiled, Lara Croft: Tomb Raider – The Cradle of Life and The Thieves.

Career
Yam started off as a model before becoming an actor in the mid 1970s. He then signed with the Hong Kong television network TVB, starring and co-starring in a number of television series prior to "apply his trades" in the film industry in 1987. His elder brother is Yam Tak-wing, a retired former Deputy Commissioner of Hong Kong Police.

In 1989, he starred in the Japanese-Hong Kong co-production of Bloodfight. This was the first of its kind in which English was spoken throughout the entire film. In 1992, Yam gained critical acclaim for his role as the maniacal Judge in the crime film Full Contact, where he faced off in a bloody battle against Chow Yun-fat's character. In 1993, he starred as "Dhalsim" in the action-comedy film Future Cops, a parody of Street Fighter directed by Wong Jing. In 1996, Yam began his role as Chiang Tin-Sung, the leader of the Hung Hing triads in the first three instalments of the Young and Dangerous film series.

In 2000, Yam starred as Cheung San, the progenitor of all vampires, in the television series My Date with a Vampire II, produced by ATV. In 2003, Yam made his Hollywood film debut in Lara Croft: Tomb Raider – The Cradle of Life as Shaolin crime lord.

In 2013, Yam directed his first film, as part of the Hong Kong portmanteau horror film Tales from the Dark 1.

In Feb 2021, Yam, Tony Leung and Andy Lau will team up in a new major action movie titled Goldfinger, backed by Emperor Motion Pictures and mainland Chinese partners, with a reported budget of around $30.8 million (RMB200 million).

Personal life
Yam was married to his first wife Ho Sui-yi from 1981-86.
In 1997, he married Sophia Kao, known as Qi Qi, an international model. She was born in Shanghai but raised in Austria. They have a daughter, Ella.

On 20 July 2019, Yam was stabbed at a promotional event in China.
He suffered a minor injury and his manager said, "He was stabbed in the tummy area and also got a cut on his right hand." He got a small operation in Zhongshan and recovered.

Yam's favorite investment is real estate in Hong Kong.

Filmography

Film

Television series

Awards and nominations

Hong Kong Film Awards
 Best Supporting Actor Nomination for The Be No. 1
 Best Supporting Actor Nomination for Juliet in Love
 Best Supporting Actor Nomination for Midnight Fly
 Best Actor Nomination for PTU
 Best Actor Nomination for Election
 Best Supporting Actor Nomination for Election 2
 Best Actor Nomination for Eye in the Sky
 Best Actor Nomination for Sparrow
 Best Actor Nomination for Night and Fog
 Best Actor for Echoes of the Rainbow
(6 Best Actor Nominations, four Best Supporting Actor Nominations)

Golden Horse Awards
 Best Actor Nomination for PTU
Golden Bauhinia Awards
 Best Actor for PTU
 Best Actor for Election
Asia Pacific Screen Awards
 Best Performance by an Actor for Sparrow

References

External links 
Simon Yam at LoveHKFilm.com
 
 HK Cinemagic entry
 Simon Yam discusses Ocean Flame

1955 births
Living people
Hong Kong male film actors
Hong Kong film producers
Hong Kong film directors
Hong Kong male television actors
Hong Kong people of Shandong descent
20th-century Hong Kong male actors
21st-century Hong Kong male actors